This is a list of minor characters in the Seafort Saga created by David Feintuch. It includes characters other than the protagonist, Nicholas Seafort.

Carr, Derek
Derek Anthony Carr was initially a passenger travelling to Hope Nation aboard Hibernia with his father Randolph, who intended to resume direct control of the plantation he owned there. Born in Upper New York, Carr was originally spoiled and arrogant, contemptuously dismissing ship board life with the question 'is this what you call living?' After the senior Carr was killed in the accident at Celestina, Derek enlisted as a cadet, the first of Hibernia's passengers to do so. He served throughout Hibernia's voyage, being appointed midshipman shortly before the attack at Miningcamp, and later successfully challenged Philip Tyre for control of the wardroom. Carr went on to serve with Seafort aboard Portia, and offered his services to Seafort when the latter was transferred to Challenger, only to be turned down, just as was Vax Holser. Shortly prior to his destruction of Orbit Station, Seafort appointed Carr as observer to the newly independent Commonwealth of Hope Nation, and following the end of his term of service Carr became First Staadholder of the Commonwealth, and head of state. At the time of the Naval Rebellion Carr was visiting Earth for trade negotiations, and insisted on accompanying Seafort to Galactic and reenlisting into the UNNS. Carr was killed by decompression during the loss of Galactic.

Appearances
 Midshipman's Hope
 Challenger's Hope
 Prisoner's Hope
 Patriarch's Hope

Frowel, Amanda
Amanda Frowel was a passenger aboard Hibernia when she and Seafort first met, travelling to Hope Nation to teach natural science at the school in Centraltown.  They quickly became close friends, and later lovers after the accident at Celestina.  Their relationship became strained after Seafort's elevation to the captaincy, and ended with Amanda's strong disapproval of the execution of Tuak and Rogoff.  They reconciled to a degree following Seafort's courage at the battle of Miningcamp, and after Hibernia's arrival at Hope Nation resumed their relationship during an excursion to the Ventura mountains.  Amanda remained in Hope Nation while Hibernia continued on to Detour, but upon the ship's return to Hope was reunited with Seafort, and the two married on the return voyage.  Amanda Seafort, although pregnant, travelled with her husband aboard Portia, giving birth to her and Nicholas' son, Nate, in the ship's infirmary.  After Nate's death from a Fish virus she fell into a deep depression, and committed suicide in Portia's aft airlock.

Appearances
 Midshipman's Hope
 Challenger's Hope

Fuentes, Ricardo
Ricardo "Ricky" Fuentes was initially ship's boy of Hibernia when Seafort first took command, and was made a Cadet as part of the drive to remedy the ship's chronic lack of officers.  Upon Hibernia's return to Earth he went to the Naval Academy and did exceptionally well, coming first in navigation class, and being assigned to the fastship Victoria as a reward.  Fuentes served on Victoria throughout the events surrounding the Battle of Hope Nation and the ship's return to Earth following the battle.  He was killed at the Battle of Home System when Victoria was lost with all hands.

Appearances
 Midshipman's Hope
 Prisoner's Hope

Holser, Vax
Vax Stanley Holser was the next most senior midshipman aboard UNS Hibernia after Seafort, junior to him by only four months. He initially resented this, leading to a fight between the two of them over control of the Midshipmen's wardroom. Holser was a bully, often hazing junior midshipmen with little or no reason, until Nick Seafort put a stop to his behaviour. Seafort believed Holser to be better suited to the Captaincy than he, and attempted to persuade Captain Harv Malstrom to promote Holser to Lieutenant, and thus above him the Hibernia's chain of command, before the Captain's death. Malstrom did not do so, and so Seafort became Captain of Hibernia. Following his elevation to Captaincy, Seafort put Holser through a series of rigorous tests to ensure he would not slip back into his earlier bullying behaviour, ultimately ordering him the clean the ship's huge launch berth alone. Holser passed these tests, and ultimately became a trusted and loyal subordinate, whom Seafort promoted to Lieutenant shortly before arriving at Hope Nation, and even risking his career and life to save Seafort in the first encounter with the aliens known as the 'Fish'. Holser sailed again with Seafort on UNS Portia as first lieutenant, and offered to accompany him to Challenger when Admiral Tremaine transferred his flag. Seafort refused the offer, angering Holser greatly, and ending the friendship that had grown between them. Holser became the Commander of the fastship Victoria, and was ultimately killed when he knocked Seafort out, placed him in a lifeboat, and remained on Hope Nation's Orbit Station to detonate the station's nuclear device and destroy the flotilla of Fish that had gathered around it.

Appearances
 Midshipman's Hope
 Challenger's Hope
 Prisoner's Hope

Keene, Thomas
Thomas Keene was the senior midshipman of the naval academy during Seafort's tenure as commandant. During the final battle of Home System Keene commanded Fuser Two, and carried out a reconnaissance of the B'n Auba Zone during the battle. He recognised Seafort's fiction regarding the extent of the Zone for what it was, but nevertheless took his Fuser in, and was able to report that the Fish, like UN ships, were unable to escape. By 2241 a cadet barracks at the academy had been named after him.

Appearances
 Fisherman's Hope

Tenere, Adam
Adam Tenere, the son of Captain Andrew Tenere, was a midshipman at the academy during Seafort's tenure. In the final battle Seafort intended for him to take command of Fuser Eight, but Tenere was unable to board due to a Fish attack. He served aboard Trafalgar and so survived the battle. Tenere later married and fathered a son, Jared. When Jared Tenere disappeared into lower New York, followed by Philip Seafort, Adam accompanied his former commandant in pursuit, and was caught up the Transpop Rebellion. Tenere died attempting to warn transpops in the tunnels beneath the streets of an imminent cyanide gas attack, and was caught up in the attack himself. His body was found by Philip Seafort.

Appearances
 Fisherman's Hope
 Voices of Hope

Tamarov, Alexi
Alexi Tamarov was Hibernia's third midshipman after Seafort and Holser. He played an important role in Midshipman's Hope as, were it not for the skylarking between him and Sandy Wilsky, it would have been he and not Lieutenant Lisa Dagalow who died in the accident that ultimately resulted in Seafort becoming Captain. Tamarov, only sixteen at the beginning of the series, was initially somewhat childish, but rapidly matured into an experienced and trustworthy officer. He was Hibernia's first midshipman from Holser's promotion to Lieutenant until the arrival of Philip Tyre, and following his own promotion to Lieutenant was put in charge of the wardroom to deal with Tyre. After Hibernia's return, Tamarov became second lieutenant of Portia, and during her voyage finally came to terms with the fact that his hatred of Tyre was spiralling out of control, and ended his vindictive hounding of the midshipman. Upon Seafort's second arrival in Hope Nation, Tamarov acted as his second in Seafort's duel with Admiral Tremaine, and later became his aide as he recovered. Acting as such, Tamarov was seriously injured in a terrorist attack, lying in a coma for some time, and later suffering from amnesia, although he eventually recovered, and rose to Captain of his own ship, marrying and fathering two children. Tamarov was killed in the Rotunda bombing that paralyzed Seafort.

Appearances
 Midshipman's Hope
 Challenger's Hope
 Prisoner's Hope
 Patriarch's Hope

Tolliver, Edgar
Edgar Tolliver was Cadet Corporal of Seafort's barracks during his time at the Naval Academy, and was extremely unpopular with the young cadet, who felt that Tolliver hazed him to an unnecessary degree. Tolliver on the other hand merely thought of the hazing as 'part of the drill'. He was later promoted to Lieutenant and assigned to Portia at some point after Seafort left the ship, until he was reassigned to replace Alexi Tamarov as Seafort's aide. While serving in that capacity the heli the two were travelling in was fire on by a surface-to-air missile, and Tolliver threw Seafort aside to seize the controls and take evasive action. Rather than court-martial and execute Tolliver for touching him, as the strict naval regulations would have demanded, Seafort instead opted to give him administrative punishment, and demoted the Lieutenant to Midshipman. Tolliver remained as Seafort's aide throughout the battle of Hope Nation that followed, and eventually an understanding grew between the two. Seafort would retain Tolliver as his aide, saving his career that had been ruined by his demotion, and Tolliver would have 'special dispensation' to criticise and talk back to Seafort at will, in private. Tolliver served in this capacity throughout Seafort's time as academy commandant, and following the battle of Home System persuaded Seafort to keep the details of how the academy's cadets had been duped into sailing to their deaths in the Fusers secret. Tolliver remained in the Navy, eventually rising to Captain, and during the transpop rebellion attempted to contact Seafort to dissuade him from his course into Earthport's laser batteries. His call was ignored by Philip Seafort. During the naval rebellion Tolliver answered his friend's call to arms, and lead academy cadets in their assault on Lunapolis' laser cannon, although he was unable to seize them in time to prevent their firing on Galactic. When Seafort accepted command of Olympiad, Tolliver turned up on the bridge, unannounced, to offer his services as first lieutenant, an officer Seafort grudgingly accepted. During the second Fish crisis at Hope Nation, Tolliver took command of Olympiad after Seafort was seriously injured by Randy Carr, and again when the Captain was captured by religious extremists. He was relieved of duty and confined to quarters when Lieutenant Sarah Frand seized the ship, and only reluctantly agreed to desist from acting against her on the voyage back to Earth.

Appearances
 Prisoner's Hope
 Fisherman's Hope
 Patriarch's Hope
 Children of Hope

Tyre, Philip
Midshipman Philip Tyre was posted to Hibernia at Hope Nation as first midshipman, as the ship at the time had only two midshipmen and two cadets, and of the midshipmen Derek Carr had been a civilian only a few months previously. Although a courteous and efficient officer while dealing with his superiors, Tyre's dealings with his subordinates in the wardroom were little short of tyrannical, assigning demerits to his juniors too fast to work off, and thus effectively sentencing them to repeated canings. The resultant plummeting morale of the midshipmen, along with Tyre's inability to understand why his behaviour was causing such trouble, ultimately led Seafort to promote Alexi Tamarov to Lieutenant with orders to 'put things back in order'. With such orders Tamarov dealt out to Tyre the same treatment Tyre had given the other midshipmen, dealing out demerits and frequently ordering the first midshipman caned. Along with Derek Carr's challenge and defeat of his senior for control of the wardroom, this led to Tyre pleading with Admiral Brentley upon Hibernia's return to Earth to be allowed to resign, but Seafort instead offered to take Tyre with him on his next ship. Aboard Portia, Tamarov continued to hound Tyre, until eventually Seafort was forced to step in himself to end what had turned from a justified controlling of a vicious character to an unjustified hounding of a broken subordinate. When Seafort was transferred to Challenger on Admiral Tremaine's orders, Tyre was sent with him, against Seafort's wishes, and during the ship's ordeal proved himself a conscientious officer, who had put his former viciousness aside and ably took command of Challenger after Seafort became seriously ill after being shot by a mutineer. Tyre was killed during Challenger's final battle, after taking the ship's launch and ramming an alien, having been promoted to Lieutenant in his final moments. Seafort later named his son, Philip Tyre Seafort, in honour of Tyre.

Appearances
 Midshipman's Hope
 Challenger's Hope
 Children of Hope (mentioned only)

Wilsky, Sandy
Sandy Wilsky was the youngest and most junior of Hibernia's midshipmen, a status that led to his frequent hazing by Vax Holser. Wilsky frequently found himself in trouble due to his youthful high spirits. Sandy Wilsky was the first of Hibernia's original midshipman to die--killed attempting to prevent the boarding of the ship at Miningcamp by Kerwin Jones' mutineers. Seafort threw the individual responsible out of the airlock.

Appearances
 Midshipman's Hope

References

Characters in written science fiction
Seafort Saga